HotHead Productions is a long-running sound design and post-production studio in New York. For a period of time, the company was responsible for about 80% of Nickelodeon's sound design.

HotHead opened in 2003 when legendary sound guru Tom Clack closed the original precursor to the studio, Clack Sound Studios. Since then, HOThead has grown to offer a comprehensive suite of services to its ever-expanding client base. The company has done work for every single major cable channel.

Projects
'Twas the Night Before Christmas (1974)
The First Christmas: The Story of the First Christmas Snow (1975)
The First Easter Rabbit (1976)
Frosty's Winter Wonderland (1976)
Rudolph's Shiny New Year (sound effects; 1976)
The Little Drummer Boy, Book II (1977)
The Hobbit (sound effects; 1977)
The Stingiest Man in Town (sound effects, 1978)
Jack Frost (sound effects, 1979)
The Return of the King (sound effects; 1980)
Nightfall - "Mindrift" (1982)
The Last Unicorn (sound effects; 1982)
The Flight of Dragons (sound effects; 1982)
The Wind in the Willows (sound effects; 1987) 
Nick Jr. ID - "Duck Blocks" (1996)
The 90's Are All That (2011)
Figure It Out (2012)

External links
HotHead Official website

Recording studios in Manhattan